Avarude Ravukal is an Indian Malayalam film written and directed by Shanil Muhammed. It features Asif Ali, Unni Mukundan, Vinay Forrt, Honey Rose, Milana Nagaraj and Nedumudi Venu. It was produced by Ajay Krishnan under the banner of Ajay entertainments.
The Film Released on 2017 June 23 with mixed reviews.

Plot
It's a story woven around 3 youngsters and their search for new life in Cochin city, they are from different places. Ashik, Sidharth and Vijay stay together in a house of an old man named Scobo Jones for free by solving a puzzle. Jones teaches them there are two ways to approach a problem in life and that often only one path that too with repetitive effort will turn struggling events into unexpected bliss form the plot of the movie.

Cast

Production
In 2015 Shanil Muhammed, who earlier directed the Malayalam children's film, Philips and the Monkey Pen, announced the film titled Avarude Ravukal with Asif Ali, Unni Mukundan and Honey Rose in the lead roles. The Shooting of the film started at Kochi, Salem, Attappadi, Munnar and Vagamon.

The film's producer Ajay Krishnan committed suicide on 24 April 2016, a month before the scheduled release of the film. It was widely reported that the producer was unhappy after watching the preview of the film and he was also having some financial problems. Ajay's girlfriend Vineetha Nair also committed suicide a week after Ajay's death. Ajay's untimely death delayed the release of the film and it is released one year later on 23 June 2017.

References

External links
 Avarude Raavukal, IMDB

2017 films
2010s Malayalam-language films
Films shot in Munnar
Films shot in Kochi
Films shot in Palakkad